The 2009 SBS Drama Awards is a ceremony honoring the best performances in television on the SBS network for the year 2009. It was held on December 31, 2009, at the SBS Open Hall in Deungchon-dong, Seoul, and was hosted by actor Jang Keun-suk, actress Moon Geun-young and announcer Park Sun-young.

Nominees and winners
Complete list of nominees and winners:

Top 10 Stars 
Bae Soo-bin - Brilliant Legacy
Cha Seung-won - City Hall
Han Hyo-joo - Brilliant Legacy
Jang Keun-suk - You're Beautiful
Jang Seo-hee - Temptation of Wife
Kim Hye-soo - Style
Kim Sun-a - City Hall
Lee Seung-gi - Brilliant Legacy
Lee Soo-kyung - Loving You a Thousand Times
So Ji-sub - Cain and Abel

New Star Award 
Jin Tae-hyun - Temptation of an Angel
Jung Gyu-woon - Loving You a Thousand Times
Jung Yong-hwa - You're Beautiful
Kim Bum - Dream
Lee Hong-gi - You're Beautiful
Lee Min-jung - Smile, You
Lee So-yeon - Temptation of an Angel
Lee Tae-im - Don't Hesitate
Lee Yong-woo - Style
Oh Young-shil - Temptation of Wife
Park Shin-hye - You're Beautiful
Son Dam-bi - Dream

References

External links
 

SBS
SBS Drama Awards
SBS
December 2009 events in South Korea